Vilna is a historic village in central Alberta, Canada.

History 
Vilna was founded in 1907, mostly by central European settlers, and started to develop in 1919, when the railroad reached this area. It was named in 1920 after the Lithuanian capital city of Vilnius, similarly to the community of Wilno in Ontario, Canada. Before 1920, the local post office was named "Villette".  Vilna was incorporated as a village on June 13, 1923.

On February 5, 1967, Vilna experienced a meteor air burst with a yield estimated at 600 tonnes of TNT (2.5 TJ).

Demographics 

In the 2016 Census of Population conducted by Statistics Canada, the Village of Vilna recorded a population of 290 living in 114 of its 143 total private dwellings, a  change from its 2011 population of 249.

The Village of Vilna's 2012 municipal census counted a population of 290.

Attractions

The town claims to be home to the world's largest metal sculpture mushroom.

See also 
List of communities in Alberta
List of villages in Alberta

References

External links 

1923 establishments in Alberta
Villages in Alberta